Polidoro da Fonseca Quintanilha Jordão, the Viscount of Santa Teresa, (2 November 1802 - 13 January 1879) was a Brazilian general and politician who served as Minister of War of the Empire of Brazil and fought in the Paraguayan War.

Biography

Early life 
The son of colonel João Florêncio Jordão, Polidoro was born in Rio de Janeiro on 2 November 1802. After finishing the humanities course, he was accepted into the Military Academy of Rio de Janeiro on 20 January 1823, becoming a cadet on 7 February 1824. Polidoro rose through the military ranks, succesively being promoted to second lieutenant via decree on 12 October 1824; first lieutenant on 17 February 1825; and captain on 10 March 1827. He graduated the engineering course at the Academy on 22 December 1831.

Polidoro was later promoted to major on 12 July 1837; lieutenant colonel on 3 August 1841 and colonel on 26 July 1851. On 15 November 1853 he was appointed Chief of Staff of the Superior Command of the National Guard of Brazil, being promoted to brigadier on 2 December 1856 . With the formation of a new cabinet headed by prime minister Pedro de Araújo Lima, the marquess of Olinda, on 30 May 1862, Polidoro was appointed Minister of War. He exercised this office until 12 May 1863.

On 28 September 1862 he was appointed a justice in the Supreme Military Council, becoming Councillor of War in the council on 27 June 1867.

Paraguayan War 
With the outbreak of the Paraguayan War, general Manuel Luís Osório, then Commander-in-Chief of the Brazilian Army in Paraguay, requested the appointment of a trusted officer who could replace him in the event of impediments. Polidoro was then appointed by the imperial government, not only for Osório's impediments, but also to replace the Viscount of Porto Alegre in command of the 2nd Army Corps. As soon as he arrived in Paraguay, with Osório's ailments increasing, Polidoro took command of the 1st Army Corps, beginning his work in the Battle of Curupayty, in which the Allied forces suffered a great defeat. Polidoro also commanded the 2nd Army Corps during the war.

Later years and death 
Polidoro died in Rio de Janeiro on 13 January 1879 with the rank of lieutenant general; his remains were buried in the São João Batista Cemetery.

Titles and honors

Titles of nobility 

 Viscount of Santa Teresa (without greatness) on 27 April 1870;
 Viscount of Santa Teresa (with greatness) on 24 March 1871.

Other titles 

 Grandee of the Empire of Brazil.

Honors 

 Grand Cross of the Brazilian Order of Aviz;
 Commander of the Order of the Rose;

Military honors 

 Medal awarded to the army, armada and to civil servants in operations in the Paraguayan War;
 Medal of Military Merit;
 Medal of Military Bravery.

Notes

References

Citations

Bibliography 

 
 
 
 

Government ministers of Brazil
1802 births
1879 deaths
Brazilian nobility
Burials at Cemitério de São João Batista
Marshals of Brazil
Brazilian military personnel of the Paraguayan War
19th-century Brazilian military personnel
19th-century Brazilian politicians